Mohd. Nurkhuzaini bin Ab. Rahman is a Malaysian politician and currently serves as Terengganu State Executive Councillor.

Election Results

References

Living people
People from Terengganu
Malaysian people of Malay descent
Malaysian Muslims
Malaysian Islamic Party politicians
Members of the Terengganu State Legislative Assembly
Terengganu state executive councillors
21st-century Malaysian politicians
1971 births